Harrisville Historic District may refer to a location in the United States:

 Harrisville Historic District (Harrisville, New Hampshire)
 Harrisville Historic District (Burrillville, Rhode Island)
 Harrisville Historic District (Harrisville, West Virginia), listed on the NRHP in West Virginia